Britt Biltoft Raaby (born 20 January 1978 in Guldager, Esbjerg) is a former freestyle swimmer from Denmark, who represented her native country at the 1996 Summer Olympics in Atlanta, Georgia.

A member of swimming club Hjerting Idrætsforening she is best known for winning the bronze medal at the 1997 European Championships (LC) in the women's 4×200 m freestyle, alongside Ditte Jensen, Berit Puggaard, and Mette Jacobsen.

References
sports-reference

1978 births
Living people
Danish female swimmers
Olympic swimmers of Denmark
Swimmers at the 1996 Summer Olympics
Danish female freestyle swimmers
European Aquatics Championships medalists in swimming
People from Esbjerg
Sportspeople from the Region of Southern Denmark